The 1984 North Carolina lieutenant gubernatorial election was held on November 6, 1984. Democratic nominee Robert B. Jordan defeated Republican nominee John H. Carrington with 53.70% of the vote.

Primary elections
Primary elections were held on May 8, 1984.

Democratic primary

Candidates
Robert B. Jordan, State Senator
Carl J. Stewart Jr., former Speaker of the North Carolina House of Representatives
Stephen S. Miller

Results

Republican primary

Candidates
John H. Carrington, businessman
Frank Jordan
William S. Hiatt, former State Representative
Barbara S. Perry
Erick P. Little

Results

General election

Candidates
Robert B. Jordan, Democratic
John H. Carrington, Republican

Results

References

1984
Gubernatorial
North Carolina